Michael Shaeffer is an English actor, known for his roles as "Longcross" in the BBC political-thriller television series Bodyguard (2018), Sergeant Yelland in the BBC mystery thriller  The ABC Murders (2018) and Stephen Kemp in the BBC fact-based drama The Salisbury Poisonings (2020).

Filmography

Theatre

References

External links
 

21st-century English male actors
Alumni of Rose Bruford College
English male stage actors
English male film actors
English male television actors
Living people
1975 births